Goat Mountain may refer to:

(In the United States alone, the USGS identifies over 20 summits named "Goat Mountain".)

Goat Mountain (Alaska), in the Chugach Mountains
 Goat Mountain (California), In Kings Canyon National Park
Goat Mountain (Blaine County, Idaho)
 Goat Mountain in Beaverhead County, Montana
 Goat Mountain in Blaine County, Montana
Goat Mountain (Glacier County, Montana) (located in Glacier National Park)
 Goat Mountain in Granite County, Montana
 Goat Mountain in McCone County, Montana
 Goat Mountain in Meagher County, Montana
 Goat Mountain in Mineral County, Montana
 Goat Mountain in Missoula County, Montana
 Goat Mountain in Silver Bow County, Montana - see List of mountains in Silver Bow County, Montana
 Goat Mountain (Whatcom County) Washington state
Goat Mountain (Canada) in the Cayoosh Range, British Columbia, Canada - see Highest mountain peaks of Canada
 Goat Mountain (Vancouver, British Columbia), Canada
 Goat Mountain in Cherryville, British Columbia - see List of mountains of Canada
 Goat Mountain Wind Ranch, a wind farm in Texas

See also
Goat Peak (British Columbia), Canada
Goat Peak, Washington, United States
Goat Fell, the highest point on the Isle of Arran, Scotland
Mountain goat (disambiguation)